The 2023 Iditarod was the 51st edition of the Iditarod, an annual sled dog race in the U.S. state of Alaska. It began on March 4, 2023, with a ceremonial  start in Anchorage, Alaska. The official  race began the following day in Willow, Alaska, and is scheduled to end within 9 to 10 days in Nome, Alaska. It will use the southern route of the Iditarod Trail, which was last used in the 2019 edition. The 2023 race has 33 mushers, the smallest field of competitors in its history; the decline in participants is attributed to financial issues following the COVID-19 pandemic and an ongoing inflation surge. The field includes reigning champion Brent Sass and 2019 champion Peter Kaiser.

References

Iditarod
Iditarod 
Iditarod